Yakgwa, also called gwajul, is a type of yumil-gwa, which is deep-fried, wheat-based hangwa (Korean confection) made with honey,  cheongju (rice wine), sesame oil, and ginger juice. Traditionally, the sweet was offered in a jesa (ancestral rite) and enjoyed on festive days such as chuseok (harvest festival),  marriages, or hwangap (sixtieth-birthday) celebrations. In modern South Korea, it is also served as a dessert and can be bought at traditional markets or supermarkets.

Etymology 
Yakgwa, consisting of two syllables, yak ("medicine") and gwa ("confection"), means "medicinal confection". This name comes from the large amount of honey that is used to prepare it, because pre-modern Koreans considered honey to be medicinal and so named many honey-based foods yak ("medicine").

"Honey cookie" is a common English translation for this confection's name.

History 
Yakgwa is a food with a long history. It was made for Buddhist rites during the Later Silla era (668–935). It was popular during the Goryeo Dynasty and was enjoyed by royal families, aristocrats, temples, and private houses. During the Goryeo era (918–1392), yakgwa was used for pyebaek (a formal greeting) in the wedding ceremony of Goryeo kings and Yuan princesses.

Yakgwa was originally made in the shape of birds and animals, but it became flatter for ease of stacking during the Joseon era (1392–1897). Each pattern signifies a wish; butterflies represent a happy marriage, bats bring fortune, and pine trees symbolize the beginning of a new year. One would print a lotus for harmony and a pomegranate for fertility. Then, in the Joseon Kingdom, it was simplified into a sphere. However, the balls were not suitable for presenting at the table for ancestral rites. So it transformed into a cube. Eventually, the yakgwa was stylized to take its current shape, round with a rippled edge.

In pre-modern Korea, yakgwa was mostly enjoyed by the upper classes, as wheat was a rare and cherished ingredient, and honey was also regarded highly. Today yakgwa is common to serve with tea, but can also be gifts for special occasions.

Preparation and varieties 
The dough is made by kneading sifted wheat flour with sesame oil, honey, ginger juice, and cheongju (rice wine). Flours and sesame oil (are rubbed together with hands, and then passed through a mesh sieve. Sugar syrup in soju are added to the resulting flour and sesame oil mixture, which is then kneaded, sheeted, and cut into squares. Sugar syrup is prepared by boiling mixture of sugar and water for 10 min and then starch syrup is added. Yakgwa gets its shape by being pressed into flower-shaped wooden molds called yakgwa-pan, or flattened with a mallet and cut into squares. Depending on the size, yakgwa is classified into dae-yakgwa (large), jung-yakgwa (medium), and so-yakgwa (small). The ones cut into squares or rectangles are called mo-yakgwa (angular yakgwa). The deep-fried cookies are then soaked in honey, mixed with cinnamon powder, and dried, which gives the yakgwa a sweet taste and a soft, moist texture. The treat may also be sprinkled with various topping such as pine nuts or sesame seeds.

Research and further developments 
A report released the food science and biotechnology department in Inha University, South Korea researched effects of Jupcheong (soaking syrup) with and without ginger powder in the yakgwa recipe and then letting it store for a few weeks. The dough pieces were deep fried in soy bean oil at 90 to 150 degrees c, soaked in syrup with and without ginger powder, and lastly stored at 30 degrees c in the dark for 8 weeks. It was found that jupcheong especially with ginger could improve the lipid oxidative stability of yakgwa by higher protection of tocopherols and lignans than polyphenols from degradation, and tocopherols were the most important antioxidants in reducing lipid oxidation of yakgwa.  With the use of ginger powder instead of the traditional ginger juice used in the recipe, the powder helps support the lipid oxidative in yakgwa. The lipid oxidative in yakwa deteriorates fat and has other health benefits.

Additionally, in 2014 the Dong Eui University academic cooperation foundation and Sancheon Korea medicine yakchs patent application for health functional yakgwa. The Korean intellectual released the following abstract, “The present invention relates to a health functional fried honey cake usingmedicinal plants and a method for manufacturing the same. The health functional fried honey cake according to the present invention is manufactured by being baked in an oven instead of a traditional way using Eucommia, monarchy, Angelica, mulberry leaves, or tea powder, thereby reducing more calories and fat than when fried honey cake is manufactured by the traditional way and improving antioxidant functions, flavor, and health.”

See also 
 List of Korean desserts

References 

Korean desserts
Hangwa